Foot Lake is a lake in Kandiyohi County, in the U.S. state of Minnesota.

Foot Lake was named for Solomon R. Foot, a pioneer settler.

See also
List of lakes in Minnesota

References

Lakes of Minnesota
Lakes of Kandiyohi County, Minnesota